3rd Millennium's Choice, Vol. 1 is a compilation album by the German electronic composer Peter Frohmader, released independently in 1991.

Track listing

Personnel 
Adapted from the 3rd Millennium's Choice, Vol. 2 liner notes.
 Peter Frohmader – electric guitar, sampler, synthesizer, musical arrangement
 Anke Gerkens – classical guitar (1)
 Richard Kurländer – harp (1, 2)
 Stephan Manus – violin (1)
 Birgit Metzger – vocals (1)

Release history

References 

1991 compilation albums
Peter Frohmader albums